Gethin Clifford Jones (born 12 February 1978) is a Welsh television presenter. He was an active rugby union player while at Manchester Metropolitan University and, after graduation, he began his television career on Welsh language channel S4C as a presenter of children's programmes such as Popty, Mas Draw and the flagship children's entertainment show Uned 5 (Unit 5, 2002–2005).

In 2005, Jones became the 31st presenter of BBC children's programme Blue Peter. In 2020, he began presenting the BBC1 five-mornings-a-week magazine show Morning Live, broadcast from studios in Manchester. After a trial run ending in December 2020, the success of the programme has seen it commissioned as an all-year-round part of the BBC1 schedule.

Early life and education
Jones was born on 12 February 1978 in Cardiff, the son of Sylvia (née Groskop), a violin teacher, and Goronwy Jones, headteacher of Baden Powell Primary School. He has an older sister, Mererid. One of his maternal great-grandfathers was a Polish-Jewish immigrant. With Welsh as his first language, he attended Ysgol Gynradd Coed-y-Gof and Ysgol Gyfun Gymraeg Glantaf (in Llandaff North, Cardiff) for his primary and secondary school education, respectively. Jones has Grade 8 violin and Grade 6 piano qualifications, and took part in school musicals and school and county orchestras. He took Biology, Geography and Economics at A-Levels.

Jones had dual interests throughout school.  His mother wanted him to develop his musical talents, while he enjoyed rugby union. While studying Economics and Geography at Manchester Metropolitan University where he gained a 2:2, he was captain of the university's rugby first team and played in the Lancashire under-21 team. At the age of 21 in his final year, Jones was offered trials by Sale RFC. However, he was not good enough, and he eventually set aside his plans for a professional rugby career and returned to Wales.

Professional career
Prior to his television career, Jones worked as a bank clerk, a telephone hotline officer and as a research assistant and spent three months as a builder laying house foundations. He subsequently joined Welsh channel S4C as a presenter of children's programmes such as Popty (the Welsh equivalent of Top of the Pops), Mas Draw, and the flagship children's entertainment show Uned 5 (2002–05). In 2004, as part of a challenge on the show, he learned how to fly a plane and gained his pilot's licence.

In 2003, Jones was voted Bachelor of the Year by the readers of Company magazine.

Blue Peter

On 26 April 2005, Jones became a presenter of the children's television series, Blue Peter. He auditioned on the same day as co-presenter Zöe Salmon. During his time, Jones presented the show with Salmon, Konnie Huq, Matt Baker, Liz Barker and Andy Akinwolere. As a presenter, he took on the action/adventure role filled by John Noakes and Peter Duncan in the past; highlights included flying with the Red Arrows and in a World War II Supermarine Spitfire, completing submarine escape training with the Royal Navy, surviving the Bolivian jungle, being attacked by an alligator in Louisiana. learning to race like a jockey, and fighting as a samurai warrior in Japan.

In 2006, Jones became the second civilian to finish the Royal Marine Commando  Yomp – he finished in a time of eight hours and 20 minutes. He also played the violin at the Proms with the BBC Philharmonic.

On 12 February 2008, on his 30th birthday, Jones and his Blue Peter co-presenters climbed the highest peaks in each constituent country of the United Kingdom, starting with Slieve Donard in Northern Ireland, followed by Snowdon in North Wales. The following day, having travelled overnight by coach to the Lake District, they climbed Scafell Pike. They were then to be transported to Scotland by helicopter to climb Ben Nevis, but were unable to do so because of problems with the helicopter, forcing them to land in Oban. They succeeded in climbing the mountain the next day. This challenge was in aid of Sport Relief 2008.

Jones announced on 8 April 2008 on Blue Peter that after three and half years with the show, he would be leaving at the end of the current series in June. His spokeswoman said he had always planned to leave when he turned 30. Jones said, "I've had a career on Blue Peter that you wouldn't even dream about and for that I feel privileged and fortunate. ... I've loved it, lived it ... and now I feel the time is right to leave it."

Presenter

Jones has been a presenter for a number of major live telecasts, including Mardi Gras in Cardiff in front of 40,000 people, Y Briodas Fawr (The Big Wedding, 2004–2005), and Jones Jones Jones (2006) at Cardiff's Wales Millennium Centre where the world record was broken for the biggest gathering of people with the same surname. He co-presented the 2006, 2007 and 2008 New Year's Eve programme New Year Live on BBC One with various other presenters.

On 16 February 2008, Jones began presenting a new 15-minute programme entitled E24 on BBC News with James Dagwell. Between 4 and 11 May 2008, Jones was the narrator and presenter of the 2008 BBC Young Musician of the Year. The biennial music competition was held at the Millennium Centre in Cardiff, and broadcast on BBC Two and BBC Four.

Jones made his radio debut on BBC Radio 5 Live on 5 July 2008, presenting a three-hour Saturday morning show focusing on sport and entertainment.

Jones appeared in The National Lottery: Big 7, a live programme broadcast on BBC One on 30 August 2008 where the winners of the National Lottery Awards 2008 were announced.

Jones was one of the players for the Rest of the World for Soccer Aid on 7 September 2008 on ITV. England won four goals to three. Jones was again chosen to play for the Rest of the World in the Soccer Aid match on 7 June 2010. The team won 7 goals to 6 after a penalty shoot out.

On 13 September 2008, Jones presented the Proms in the Park from Singleton Park in Swansea on the BBC as part of the Last Night of the Proms programme and was one of the concerts available for viewers with interactive television.

For six weeks from 28 September, Jones presented a programme for Virgin 1 entitled Gethin Jones' Danger Hunters, which featured adrenaline junkies and their search for the ultimate thrill. Jones presented a Police Camera Action! programme about the dangers of drink driving, which was aired on 17 December 2008 on ITV1.

2009–2011
Between 5 January and 15 April 2009, Jones hosted his first quiz show, a Welsh language rugby-themed general knowledge competition, on S4C entitled Cwis Meddiant. He followed this up with another quiz show on Sky1 called Sell Me the Answer. Filming of the 50 episodes took place at the Fountain Studios in Wembley, North London, and the programme began airing in November 2009. From 17 to 21 August 2009, Jones presented BBC One's The One Show with Gloria Hunniford filling in for Adrian Chiles and Christine Bleakley.

In 2010, Jones presented the Golden Globes programme from the red carpet in Los Angeles on Sunday 17 January 2010 with Angela Griffin and a studio show in the UK was hosted by Claudia Winkelman. The programme was broadcast on Sky1 Movies and Sky1 Movies HD, with a résumé on Sky1 at 11 pm.
On 12 February 2010, Jones was a guest on the Welsh S4C chat show Jonathan presented by Jonathan Davies.
In 2010, Jones co-hosted ITV's 71 Degrees North with Kate Thornton, which saw celebrities performing various tasks in the extreme weather conditions of Norway.

In February 2011, Jones was a guest presenter on This Morning with Gloria Hunniford. In the autumn of 2011, Jones presented ITV gameshow Holding Out For a Hero. He also hosted Remembrance Week on BBC One that November.
From 19 to 23 December, Gethin was a guest features reporter for the ITV Breakfast programme Daybreak.

2012–present
Jones and Louise Minchin presented the documentary series Crime and Punishment, which aired on BBC One on 12 March 2012. On 21 May 2012, Jones joined ITV's Daybreak full-time as a reporter. He left with the end of the show in late April 2014.

In August 2014, Jones hosted the ten-part daytime ITV quiz show, The 21st Question.

On 8 May 2016, Jones began co-presenting Sunday Morning Breakfast from 9am to 12noon over the summer with Caroline Flack across the Heart Network. He has been a reporter for Strictly Come Dancing: It Takes Two since 2016, and guest presented two episodes on 15 and 16 November 2017, standing in for Zoe Ball.

He took part in the 2016 Christmas special of Strictly Come Dancing on BBC One, partnered with Chloe Hewitt.

He presented the Hits Radio breakfast show alongside Gemma Atkinson and Comedy Dave until 2019.

In the autumn of 2020, Jones began presenting the daily morning magazine show Morning Live on BBC1, alongside Kym Marsh. The series ended on 18 December 2020 and the BBC confirmed on 17 December it would return in 2021 for a second series. This proved highly successful, earning larger audiences than the show's competition on ITV and thus has been commissioned to be an all-year-round, five-mornings-a-week format for BBC1 from the third series on.

Other work
Jones appeared as a Cyberman in a 2006 episode of Doctor Who and as a Dalek operator in the final episode in 2008. He guest-starred as himself in The Sarah Jane Adventures pilot "Invasion of the Bane" (2007).

In 2007, Jones participated in Series 5 of Strictly Come Dancing, partnering Camilla Dallerup. He came third after being voted out in a "dance-off" in the semi-final. He also appeared in the programme's Christmas Special, finishing second behind Darren Gough after each couple received a perfect score.

Jones was one of the celebrities who took part in the Strictly Come Dancing: The Live Tour! 2009. As his partner from the television show, Camilla Dallerup was dancing with Tom Chambers, Jones partnered Flavia Cacace. The tour began in Newcastle on 16 January and ended at the National Exhibition Centre in Birmingham on 22 February 2009 with a total of 44 shows. He and his dance partner achieved a total of six wins during the run of the tour.

In December 2009, Jones appeared in the 2009 Strictly Come Dancing Christmas Special along with Rachel Stevens, Ali Bastian, Ricky Whittle, Chris Hollins and Austin Healey. His partner was again Flavia Cacace. The couple were not voted into the final two, despite a score of 38 for their American Smooth.
From 4 December 2009 until 10 January 2010, Jones appeared as Prince Charming in the pantomime Cinderella at the Yvonne Arnaud Theatre, Guildford. In September 2010, Jones appeared as the Narrator in The Rocky Horror Show at Venue Cymru, Llandudno.

In 2012 Jones made a cameo appearance as himself in an episode of comedy drama Stella. In May 2012, Jones was an Olympic Torchbearer in the torch relay before the 2012 Summer Olympics.
Since August 2012, Jones has been an Ambassador for the Wandsworth series of London Sky Rides.

In 2020, Jones appeared as a contestant on Celebrity Masterchef

In 2022, he provided presentation in televised coverage of the first visit as king of King Charles III to the Welsh capital on 16 September.

Filmography

Television & radio

Actor, cameo or participant

Awards
On 5 November 2008, Jones won the title of "Ultimate Hottie" by Cosmopolitan magazine. He has been in contention with other similar competitions.

Personal life
In December 2007, Jones became romantically involved with mezzo-soprano Katherine Jenkins. They first met in 2005. It was reported they met after Jenkins sang "Time to Say Goodbye" with Italian opera singer Andrea Bocelli on an episode of Strictly Come Dancing, broadcast on 21 October 2007. Jenkins's spokesman has said: "They're old friends and they've been on several dates. But people shouldn't consider buying hats just yet."

In February 2011, Jones and Jenkins announced their engagement. However, on 30 December 2011, they both announced that they were going their separate ways.

Jones is a keen footballer (he supports Everton FC, and hosted a 2009 DVD entitled My Everton), tennis player and golfer. He is short-sighted and wore contact lenses or glasses until he underwent a laser procedure to correct his shortsightedness on 17 June 2009.

Further reading

References

External links
 

1978 births
Living people
Alumni of Manchester Metropolitan University
Blue Peter presenters
British people of Polish-Jewish descent
ITV Breakfast presenters and reporters
Mass media people from Cardiff
People educated at Ysgol Gyfun Gymraeg Glantaf
Rugby union players from Cardiff
Welsh people of Jewish descent
Welsh rugby union players
Welsh television presenters
Welsh-language television presenters